Bear Run is a  tributary of the Youghiogheny River in Fayette County, Pennsylvania, in the United States.

Bear Run is in the Appalachian Mountains and part of the Pittsburgh metropolitan area. The Fallingwater house, designed by architect Frank Lloyd Wright, is located on this stream at the locality known as Mill Run.

Bear Run is inside the Bear Run Nature Reserve, protected by the Western Pennsylvania Conservancy. Bear Run is a designated Pennsylvania Scenic River. The nearest incorporated town is Ohiopyle, once a resort town for affluent Pittsburghers reaching the Ferncliff peninsula via rail. Ohiopyle today is the focal point of tourism in the Laurel Highlands, drawing many of the same visitors as Fallingwater, located a few miles away on PA State Route 381.

Course
Bear Run rises about 3 miles northeast of Kaufmann, Pennsylvania, and then flows southwest and west to join the Youghiogheny River about 0.25 miles west of Kaufmann.

Watershed
Bear Run drains  of area, receives about 48.1 in/year of precipitation, has a wetness index of 357.26, and is about 89% forested.

Natural history
Bear Run is the location of Bear Run Watershed BDA.  The large forested area of Bear Run, an exceptional value stream, provides habitat for three plant species of special concern.

See also
List of rivers of Pennsylvania

References

External links
Pennsylvania Scenic Rivers website
WPC: Natural Resource Conservation: Bear Run Nature Reserve
Welcome to Frank Lloyd Wright's Fallingwater
Google Maps - Mill Run, PA 15464

Rivers of Pennsylvania
Tributaries of the Youghiogheny River
Rivers of Fayette County, Pennsylvania
Scenic Rivers of Pennsylvania
Protected areas of Fayette County, Pennsylvania